Rumyantsev, or Rumyantseva (feminine; Румянцева), is a Russian surname. It may refer to the following people:

The Rumyantsev family, a prominent Russian family in the 18th and early 19th centuries
Alexander Rumyantsev — several people
Andrei Rumyantsev (born 1969), Russian football player
Maria Rumyantseva (1699–1788), Russian lady in waiting
Mikhail Nikolayevich Rumyantsev (1901–1983), Soviet clown, better known by his stage name Karandash
Nadezhda Rumyantseva (1930–2008), Russian comedy actress
Nikita Rumyantsev (born 1988), Russian politician
Nikolai Rumyantsev (historian) (1892–1956), Soviet historian of Christianity 
Nikolay Rumyantsev (1754–1826), Russian Foreign Minister and Imperial Chancellor
Pyotr Rumyantsev (1725–1796), Russian field marshal
Valentin Rumyantsev (1921–2007), Soviet scientist in the field of mechanics

Russian-language surnames